Uthali Secondary School, is a secondary school in Uthali, Jibannagar Upazila of Chuadanga District, Bangladesh. It was established in 1959.

History

Uthali Secondary School was founded in 1959. Some of intelligent people of Uthali decide to make their nation more hard. That they were succeeded. In the year they make a martyr tower for remembering our great son. But Pakistani military destroyed that. After destroyed Uthali Secondary School again stand's another. But same done by Pakistan

Red Crescent 
The school Red Crescent Unit helps people affected by floods and other natural calamities. They organize Basic First Aid workshops for the students of schools and colleges.

SEQAEP 
Uthali Secondary School start SEQAEP in 2010 by Bisswasahitto Kendro. Every year Uthali Secondary School held an exam with some selected book of SEQAEP.

Debating Club 
Uthali Secondary School Debating Club (USSDC) was founded in 2009. Every year they organize inter-school and inter-class debate competitions.

Uthali Secondary school has an English language club.

References

Further reading
 

Schools in Chuadanga District
High schools in Bangladesh
1959 establishments in East Pakistan
Educational institutions established in 1959